The 1974 Toledo Rockets football team was an American football team that represented the University of Toledo in the Mid-American Conference (MAC) during the 1974 NCAA Division I football season. In their fourth season under head coach Jack Murphy, the Rockets compiled a 6–5 record (3–2 against MAC opponents), finished in a tie for second place in the MAC, and were outscored by all opponents by a combined total of 270 to 262.

The team's statistical leaders included Gene Swick with 2,234 passing yards, Mike Taormina with 609 rushing yards, and John Ross with 866 receiving yards.

Schedule

References

Toledo
Toledo Rockets football seasons
Toledo Rockets football